Anolis conspersus, also known as the Cayman Islands blue-fanned anole, Grand Cayman blue-fanned anole or Grand Cayman anole, is a species of anole found on the Cayman Islands.

References

C
Endemic fauna of the Cayman Islands
Lizards of the Caribbean
Fauna of the Cayman Islands
Reptiles described in 1887
Taxa named by Samuel Garman